Michael Schmidt (6 October 1945 – 24 May 2014) was a German photographer. His subjects of interest were Berlin and "the weight of German identity in modern history."

In 1965 Schmidt began photographing the streets, buildings and people of West Berlin in a semi-documentary approach. He went on to make a series of "ambitious projects" there, all in black and white and becoming more impressionistic, until his death in 2014. Each project was exhibited, then published as a book. Schmidt was a member of the Düsseldorf School of Photography.

In 1976, he founded the Werkstatt für Photographie (Workshop for Photography) in Berlin.

U-nit-y was exhibited at the Museum of Modern Art in New York City in 1996, Frauen was shown at the Berlin Biennale in 2010 and Lebensmittel, a series about the global food industry, at the Venice Biennale in 2013. A retrospective of his work was held at Haus der Kunst in Munich in 2010. His book Waffenruhe (1987) was included in Parr and Badger's The Photobook:  A History, Volume II. He died in 2014, a couple of days after winning the Prix Pictet for Lebensmittel.

Life and work

Schmidt was born on 6 October 1945 in East Berlin, five months after the German surrender ended World War II in Europe. His family crossed to West Berlin before the construction of the Berlin Wall in 1961. He began photographing in 1965 when he was 20 years old.

The school "played a critical role in Berlin becoming a transatlantic forum of exchange between European and American photographers."

His early series about Berlin, Stadtlandschaft (Urban Landscapes) (1974–1975) and Berlin, Stadtbilder (Berlin, Urban Images) (1976–1980), "mapped out the city in which he lived in a semi-documentary way". Other series about Berlin include Berlin-Wedding (1976–1978); Berlin nach 45 (Berlin after 45) (1980); Waffenruhe (Ceasefire) (1985–1987), about the Berlin Wall and those affected by it; and Ein-heit (U-ni-ty) (1991–1994), contemporary urban landscapes and portraits from Germany mixed with historical images from the National Socialist / Nazism period, his response to the fall of the Wall in 1989 and the subsequent reunification of East and West Germany.

Natur (Nature) (1987–1997) contains black and white images of the German landscape. Lebensmittel (foodstuff) took seven years to make, with Schmidt travelling worldwide. He photographed "across the spectrum of mass food production, from factory farms" (including salmon farms and dairy farms), and bread factories, "to industrial slaughterhouses and on to plastic-wrapped, sanitised portions of food in supermarkets."

He died on 24 May 2014.

Publications
 Berlin Kreuzberg. Berlin: Bezirksamt Kreuzberg, 1973.
 Berlin, Stadtlandschaft und Menschen. Berlin: Stapp, 1978. .
 Berlin-Wedding: Stadtlandschaft und Menschen. Berlin: Galerie u. Verl. A. Nagel, 1978. .
Second edition. Koenig, 2019. With texts by Heinz Ohff and Thomas Weski in English and German.
 Berlin-Kreuzberg. Stadtbilder = Berlin-Kreuzberg, Urban Images. Berlin: Public Verlagsgesellschaft, 1984. .
 Stadtlandschaften 1981 = Urban Landscapes 1981. Essen: Museum Folkwang, 1981.
 Benachteiligt. Berlin: Senator für Gesundheit, Soziales und Familie, 1982.
 Bilder 1979–1986. = Images 1979–1986. Hannover: Sprengel Museum, 1987. 
 Waffenruhe = Ceasefire. Berlin: Dirk Nishen, 1987. With a story by Einar Schleef.
Second edition. Foundation for Photography and Media Art with the Michael Schmidt Archive; London: Koenig Books, 2018. . With a new afterword by Thomas Weski.
 Ein-Heit. Zürich/Berlin/New York City: Scalo, 1996. . Edited by Thomas Weski.
U-nit-y. Zürich/Berlin/New York City: Scalo, 1996. .
 Landschaft – Selbst – Waffenruhe – Menschenbilder (Ausschnitte). Münster: Westfälischer Kunstverein; Munich: Kunstbunker Tumulka, 1998. . "Published in conjunction with an exhibition held at the Westfälischer Kunstverein, Oct. 24, 1998-Jan. 3, 1999, and the Kunstbunker Tumulka, Feb. 2-Mar. 7, 1999."
 Frauen = Women. Cologne: Walther König, 2000. .
 Irgendwo. Cologne: Snoeck, 2005. .
 Berlin nach 45 = Berlin after 45. Göttingen: Steidl, 2005. . Edited by Ute Eskildsen. With contributions by Janos Frecot.
 89/90. Cologne: Snoeck, 2010. .
 Lebensmittel = foodstuff. Cologne: Snoeck, 2012. .
 Natur = Nature. London: Mack, 2014. .

Award
2014: Prix Pictet for Lebensmittel

Exhibitions

Solo exhibitions
Michael Schmidt: U-ni-ty, Museum of Modern Art, New York City, January–March 1996.
Grey As Colour: Photographs Until 2009, Haus der Kunst, Munich, 2010. A retrospective of his work.
Une autre photographie allemande, Jeu de Paume, Paris, 8 June – 29 August 2021. A retrospective of his work.

Group exhibitions and during festivals
Frauen (Women, 1997-99), Berlin Biennale, Berlin, 2010.
Lebensmittel, Venice Biennale, Venice, 2013.
Work shortlisted for the Prix Pictet, Victoria and Albert Museum, London, 2014.
Conflict, Time, Photography, Tate Modern, London, November 2014 – March 2015.

Collection
Schmidt's work is held in the following public collection:
Museum of Modern Art, New York City

References

External links
 
Farm to table: Michael Schmidt exposes the reality of what we eat – in pictures at The Guardian

1945 births
2014 deaths
People from East Berlin
20th-century German photographers
21st-century German photographers
Photographers from Berlin